Miklós Luttár (June 15, 1851 – November 8, 1936) was a Slovene writer, poet and teacher in Hungary.

Luttár was  born in Murska Sobota in Vas County in the Kingdom of Hungary (now Prekmurje, Slovenia). He was the son of Miklós Luttár Sr., an ironmonger and petty nobleman, and Erzsébet Sztergár. From 1873 until 1898 he was teacher in Gančani. In 1898 was lived and worked in Fiume (now Rijeka, Croatia). After the World War I move to Budapest. Here died in 1936.

In 1888 Luttar adapted the bilingual Cathecism Máli katekizmus za katholicsanszke soule containing 32 pages in the standardized Prekmurje dialect of Slovene and 32 pages in Hungarian. It was printed in Murska Sobota. Luttar's catechism experienced a complete failure among the Slovene people and priests. Luttar's catechism is full of grammatical mistakes, besides being an Anti-Slovene Magyarization school book.

See also 
 Hungarian Slovenes
 List of Slovene writers and poets in Hungary

Literature 
 Smej, Jožef (2001): Skrb dekana Vendela Ratkoviča in dekanijske komisije za čistejši jezik v Málem katekizmusu Mikloša Luttarja iz leta 1888. Slavistična revija.
 Neverjetna usoda medžimurskega "jezika". Arhivi : glasilo Arhivskega društva in arhivov Slovenije (2016).

References

External links 
 LUTTAR, Mikloš (Obrazi slovenskih pokrajin)

1851 births
1936 deaths
People from Murska Sobota
Slovenian writers and poets in Hungary
Slovenian educators